Florian Hübner (born 1 March 1991) is a German professional footballer who plays as a centre back for 1. FC Nürnberg.

Career

SV Wehen Wiesbaden
Hübner began his career in the youth system of SV Wehen Wiesbaden and was promoted to the first team in the 2009–10 season.

Borussia Dortmund II
On 18 May 2011, Hübner signed a two-year contract and moved to Borussia Dortmund II on a free transfer. Hübner was promoted to team captain following the transfer of Christian Eggert to 1. FC Saarbrücken at the start of the 2011–12 season. He missed the second half of the 2011–12 season with a syndesmosis injury.

SV Sandhausen
In 2013, he joined SV Sandhausen.

Hannover 96
He signed for Hannover 96 for the 2016–17 season.

Union Berlin
In June 2018, Hübner transferred to Union Berlin, signing a contract there until 2020.

Personal life
His brothers Christopher and Benjamin are professional footballers and his father Bruno is director of sports at Eintracht Frankfurt.

Career statistics

References

External links
 
 

1991 births
Living people
Sportspeople from Wiesbaden
Association football defenders
German footballers
Germany youth international footballers
SV Wehen Wiesbaden players
Borussia Dortmund II players
SV Sandhausen players
Hannover 96 players
1. FC Union Berlin players
1. FC Nürnberg players
Bundesliga players
2. Bundesliga players
3. Liga players
Regionalliga players
Footballers from Hesse